
Gmina Kościelisko is a rural gmina (administrative district) in Tatra County, Lesser Poland Voivodeship, in southern Poland, on the Slovak border.

Villages
The gmina contains the villages of Dzianisz, Kościelisko and Witów.

Neighbouring gminas
Gmina Kościelisko is bordered by the town of Zakopane and by the gminas of Czarny Dunajec and Poronin. It also borders Slovakia.

References
Polish official population figures 2006

Koscielisko
Tatra County